is a bay in the city of Shima, Mie Prefecture, Japan.  It is part of the Ise-Shima region.

The bay is known for its beauty and sees many tourists each year, in particular due to a train network owned by Kintetsu which runs trains from both Osaka and Nagoya to Kashiko-jima, an island in the bay.

Pearl cultivation was first invented in this bay by Kōkichi Mikimoto in 1893.

External links
 description
 pearl farms in Ago Bay

Bays of Japan
Landforms of Mie Prefecture